The Douliou Baseball Stadium is a baseball stadium in Douliu City, Yunlin County, Taiwan. It was opened in 2005 and has a capacity of 15,000 people.

The ballpark has hosted a number of games of the CPBL as well as of the Asia Winter Baseball League, most recently in November/December 2018.

See also
 Chinese Professional Baseball League
 List of stadiums in Taiwan
 Sport in Taiwan

References

2005 establishments in Taiwan
Baseball venues in Taiwan
Buildings and structures in Yunlin County
Sports venues completed in 2005